Metasyleus is a genus of harvestmen in the family Sclerosomatidae.

Species
 Metasyleus ephippiatus Roewer, 1955
 Metasyleus orissus Roewer, 1955
 Metasyleus tenuis Roewer, 1955

References

Harvestmen
Harvestman genera